The Canadian Football League has had two franchises based in the city of Ottawa. A third franchise started in 2014.

Ottawa Rough Riders (1876–1996, founding member of the CFL in 1958) 
Ottawa Renegades (2002–2006)
Ottawa Redblacks (2014–)